Robert Joe Cross (July 4, 1931 – June 18, 1989) was an American football offensive lineman in the National Football League for the Chicago Bears, Los Angeles Rams, San Francisco 49ers, and Chicago Cardinals. He also was a member of the Boston Patriots in the American Football League and the Hamilton Tiger-Cats in the Canadian Football League. He played college football at Stephen F. Austin State University.

Early years
Cross attended Kilgore High School, where he practiced football, basketball and track. He enrolled at Kilgore Junior College. He later accepted a football scholarship from Stephen F. Austin State University, where he became a three-year starter.

In 1948, he placed second in the Border Olympics shot put competition, a track-and-field event held in Laredo in which Southwest Conference teams also participated.

In 2002, he was inducted into the Kilgore College Athletics Hall of Fame.

Professional career

Chicago Bears
Cross was selected by the Chicago Bears in the ninth round (104th overall) of the 1952 NFL Draft. Although he was named a starter as a rookie at right tackle, at the end of the season he opted to sign with the Hamilton Tiger-Cats of the Canadian Football League.

Hamilton Tiger-Cats
In 1953, he was the starting left tackle for the Hamilton Tiger-Cats, while helping the team win the Grey Cup.

Los Angeles Rams
On May 8, 1954, while he was in the process of asking for reinstatement into the National Football League, The Bears traded him to the Los Angeles Rams in exchange for defensive end Larry Brink. He was a starter at left tackle. In the 1955 NFL Championship Game, he was moved to center to replace Leon McLaughlin who was sick with mumps.

On September 9, 1956, he was traded to the San Francisco 49ers in exchange for a third round draft choice (#27-George Strugar).

San Francisco 49ers
On August 31, 1958, after two seasons of playing at left tackle, he was traded to the Chicago Cardinals in exchange for a draft choice.

Chicago Cardinals
He played two seasons with the Chicago Cardinals. In 1959, he missed his first game in the NFL.

Dallas Cowboys
Cross was selected by the Dallas Cowboys in the 1960 NFL Expansion Draft. He was tried at offensive tackle and center, but was released before the start of the season.

Boston Patriots
On November 9, 1960, he was signed as a free agent by the Boston Patriots of the American Football League. He was a part of the franchise's inaugural season, playing in 4 games before being released on December 5.

References

External links

1931 births
1989 deaths
People from Ranger, Texas
Players of American football from Texas
American football offensive tackles
Kilgore Rangers football players
Stephen F. Austin Lumberjacks football players
Chicago Bears players
Hamilton Tiger-Cats players
Los Angeles Rams players
San Francisco 49ers players
Chicago Cardinals players
Boston Patriots players
American Football League players